Mountains O'Mourne is a 1938 British musical film directed by Harry Hughes and starring Rene Ray, Niall MacGinnis and Jerry Verno. It was shot at Walton Studios near London. The film's sets were designed by the art director R. Holmes Paul. The title is a reference to the song The Mountains of Mourne, a common theme from films produced by Butcher's Film Service. The screenplay concerns two Irish families evicted from their properties.

Plot summary
Two Irish families are evicted from their properties, but their children raise the money to regain them.

Partial Cast
 Rene Ray as Mary Macree 
 Niall MacGinnis as Paddy Kelly 
 Jerry Verno as Dip Evans 
 Betty Ann Davies as Violet Mayfair 
 Charles Oliver as Errol Finnegan
 Hamilton Keene as O'Rourke
 Kaye Seeley as Peter O'Loughlin 
 Maire O'Neill as Maura Macree 
 Eve Lynd as Nikita Findley 
 Freda Jackson as Biddy O'Hara 
 Alexander Butler as Tim Kelly

References

Bibliography
 Low, Rachael. Filmmaking in 1930s Britain. George Allen & Unwin, 1985.
 Wood, Linda. British Films, 1927-1939. British Film Institute, 1986.

External links

1938 films
Films directed by Harry Hughes
Films set in Ireland
1938 musical films
British black-and-white films
British musical films
1930s English-language films
1930s British films
Butcher's Film Service films
Films shot at Nettlefold Studios